Apamea alia is a moth of the family Noctuidae. It is found in eastern and western regions of North America.

The wingspan is about 39 mm. The moth flies from June to August depending on the location.

The larva feeds on various grasses.

External links
Images
Bug Guide

Apamea (moth)
Moths of North America
Moths described in 1852
Taxa named by Achille Guenée